

League table

Results

Winning squad

Top scorers

Cup

Round of Sixteen
Partizan Beograd 1 - 0 FK Sarajevo

Hajduk Split x - x X

X x - x X

X x - x X

X x - x X

X x - x X

Nasa Krila Zemun x - x X

Crvena Zvezda Beograd x - x X

Quarter finals
Crvena Zvezda Beograd x - x X

Partizan Beograd 4 - 2 Hajduk Split

X x - x X

Nasa Krila Zemun x - x X

Semi finals
Crvena Zvezda Beograd 2 - 1 Partizan

Nasa Krila Zemun x - x X

Finals
Nasa Krila Zemun 2 - 3 Crvena Zvezda

Stadium: Stadium JNA

Attendance: 50,000

Referee: Podupski (Zagreb)

Nasa Krila: Popadić, Filipović, Jovanović, Kobe, Zvekanović, Adamović, A.Panić, Lenko Grčić, Popović, Zlatković, Borović

Crvena Zvezda: Srđan Mrkušić, Branko Stanković, Mladen Kašanin, Bela Palfi, Milivoje Đurđević, Predrag Đajić, Tihomir Ognjanov, Rajko Mitić, Kosta Tomašević, Josip Takač, Branislav Vukosavljević

See also
1948–49 Yugoslav Second League
Yugoslav Cup
Yugoslav League Championship
Football Association of Yugoslavia

External links
Yugoslavia Domestic Football Full Tables

Yugoslav First League seasons
Yugo
1948–49 in Yugoslav football